This is a summary of the electoral history of Bill Rowling, Prime Minister of New Zealand (1974–75), Leader of the Labour Party (1974–83), Member of Parliament for Buller (1962–72) and later Tasman (1972–84).

Parliamentary elections

1960 election

1962 by-election

1963 election

1966 election

1969 election

1972 election

1975 election

1978 election

1981 election

Leadership elections

1974 Leadership election

1980 Leadership election

Party elections

1966 Party Conference

1967 Party Conference

1968 Party Conference

1969 Party Conference

Notes

References

Rowling, Bill